Urban A. Henry (June 7, 1935 – February 26, 1979) was an American football defensive lineman who was an All-State football player at Morgan City High School in 1953 and played collegiately for Georgia Tech. He played professionally in the Canadian Football League for the BC Lions and Edmonton Eskimos, and in the National Football League for the Los Angeles Rams, Green Bay Packers, and Pittsburgh Steelers. He died of a heart attack at age 43.

1935 births
1979 deaths
American football defensive tackles
Edmonton Elks players
Georgia Tech Yellow Jackets football players
Green Bay Packers players
Los Angeles Rams players
People from Berwick, Louisiana
Pittsburgh Steelers players
Players of American football from Louisiana